The Finger of Justice is a 1918 American silent drama film directed by Louis Chaudet. The film is based upon the campaign to close down the red-light district of the Barbary Coast of San Francisco.

Plot
As described in a film magazine, William Randall (Barrows), a political boss, allows evil to flourish in his city district while he enjoys great profits. The arrival of the Reverend Noel Delaney (Wilbur) and his fight against the underworld frightens the political leader. When he finds his daughter Betty (Booker) has been lured into one of the dives, he goes to her rescue and is killed. His death awakens the people and shortly Delaney's efforts are successful.

Cast
 Crane Wilbur as Noel Delaney
 Henry A. Barrows as William Randall
 Jane O'Rourke as Yvonne
 Mae Gaston as Mary
 Leota Lorraine as Edith
 Beulah Booker as Betty Randall
 Velma Whitman as Louise Bradley
 Jean Hathaway as Mrs. Bradley
 John Oaker as Flip
 Jack Lott as Jack Randall

Reception
Although the film was about an anti-vice campaign, the subject of prostitution created issues in showing the film. The film was scheduled to premiere on 29 June 1918 at the Lyric Theatre in New York City, but New York did not authorize showing the film. Although the film was endorsed by the Superintendent of Police in Washington, D.C., it was banned in Maryland, New York, and Chicago.

Preservation
A copy of the film has been released on DVD.

References

External links

Review in the San Bernardino News

1918 films
1918 drama films
Silent American drama films
Arrow Film Corporation films
American silent feature films
Films directed by Louis Chaudet
1910s American films
1910s English-language films